Sadilovac is an uninhabited settlement in the Kordun region of Croatia, in the municipality of Rakovica, Karlovac County.

History
The village of Sadilovac was established in the 18th century as evidenced by the arrangement of houses along the road and the church situated at the entrance of the settlement. 

Large-scale massacres against the Serb population took place during the WWII Genocide by the Croatian fascist Ustaše regime. About 60% of Sadilovac residents lost their lives during the war.

Culture 
Orthodox church, built in 1826, was burnt down by Ustaše on 31 July 1942. The reconstruction of the church, which only started in 1989 and included reconstruction of the roof and installation of two new bells, has never been fully completed due to the 1991-1995 war.

The memorial plaque with the names of 463 civilian victims of the Sadilovac massacre of 1942, engraved in stone, is kept inside the church. The remains of the victims are buried next to the church.

The Sadilovac Orthodox Parish, which belongs to the Eparchy of Gornji Karlovac, includes the villages of Drežnik, Smoljanac (Lika), Grabovac, Lipovača, Sadilovac, Irinovac (Lika), Vaganac (Lika) i Korana.

Demographics
According to the 2001 and 2011 censuses, the village of Sadilovac has no inhabitants. The village ceased to exist in August 1995, in the course of the Croatian military operation Storm, aimed at recapturing the territory held by the rebel, ethnic Serb residents.

The 1991 census recorded that 81.71% of the village population were ethnic Serbs (67/82),  10.98% were ethnic Croats (9/82), 3.65% were Yugoslavs (3/82) and 3.65% were of other ethnic origin (3/82).

Notable natives and residents
 Čedo Rajačić (16 April 1904 — 1 February 1985) - lawyer and university professor at Faculty of Law, University of Zagreb
 Nikola Radmanović (1869 — 2 August 1941) - priest of the Serbian Orthodox church

See also 
 Sadilovac massacre in World War II, 31 July 1942 in which 463 Orthodox residents from Sadilovac and neighbouring villages lost their lives at hands of Ustaše.

References 

Ghost towns in Croatia
Serb communities in Croatia